Shau Kei Wan Government Secondary School (SGSS) is a co-educational grammar school operated by the Government of Hong Kong in Hong Kong. Located in Chai Wan Gap, the school was founded in 1961 and its medium of instruction is English.

History
It was established in 1961. It temporarily shared the building of Clementi Middle School in Fortress Hill. The current school campus on Chai Wan Road opened in the autumn of 1964. The school building was designed by the Architectural Office of the former Public Works Department, and cost HK$2,707,200.

During the 2019–20 protests, students of three neighbouring schools in Shau Kei Wan – namely SGSS, Shau Kei Wan East Government Secondary School, and Salesian English School – organised a joint protest in support of a citywide strike in November 2019. They walked silently to school with protest banners, before chanting protest slogans such as "five demands, not one less!" and "Hong Kongers, revenge!", the latter a reference to the recent death of Chow Tsz-lok.

In February 2021, during the COVID-19 pandemic, around 130 sixth form students and 10 staff members of Shau Kei Wan Government Secondary School were sent to quarantine after spending time in an examination hall with two students who were later found to be infected. The incident prompted some Hong Kong educators to question whether schools should aim to fully reopen.

Notable alumni
 Andrew Chiu – politician
 Frederick Fung – politician
 Lee Chik-yuet – politician
 Joseph Lee Kok Long – legislator of the Health Services functional constituency; assistant professor in the Department of Nursing at the Open University of Hong Kong
 Alan Tam Wing Lun – Cantopop singer

References

External links

 
SGSS Alumni Association

1961 establishments in Hong Kong
Educational institutions established in 1961
Government schools in Hong Kong
Secondary schools in Hong Kong
Shau Kei Wan